American College of Acupuncture & Oriental Medicine (ACAOM) is an educational institute in Houston, Texas. The institute provides post-baccalaureate academics and four graduate degree programs to the students in the following areas of study:

Herbology
Biomedical Science
Tai-Chi and Qi-Gong
Tui-Na

The institute also has a collaboration with the Houston Methodist Hospital Healthcare System.

References 

For-profit universities and colleges in the United States